Hydroxyethyl starch-induced pruritus is an intense itching, lasting for as long as one year, occurring following hydroxyethyl starch intravenous infusion for vascular insufficiency.There is no treatment for  the itch.

An updated clinical review on storage in different tissues describes a pattern of storage in the reticuloendothelial system and also the skin (Wiedermann). Differential storage described via immuno-electron microscopy, see Ständer 2001 below.

See also 
 Pruritus

References

Further reading 

 
 

Pruritic skin conditions